The Law Society of Ontario (LSO) is the law society responsible for the self-regulation of lawyers and paralegals in the Canadian province of Ontario. Founded in 1797 as the Law Society of Upper Canada (LSUC), its name was changed by statute in 2018.

History
  
The Law Society of Upper Canada was established in 1797 to regulate the legal profession in the British colony of Upper Canada and is the oldest self-governing body in North America. The Society governed the legal profession in the coterminous Canada West from 1841 to 1867, and in Ontario since Confederation in 1867.

The Law Society was authorized, although not created, by the Act for the better regulating of the practice of the law, a 1797 statute. Section 1 of the act simply authorized those at the time "admitted in the law and practising at the bar" in the province to form themselves into a "society". The 1797 statute allowed the Law Society to impose requirements for admission to the bar of Upper Canada and to test applicants against these standards.

That statute made no express provisions for any other people to become members of the Law Society: but the power to admit others than the existing practitioners was considered to be implied by section 5. Section 5 provided that "no person other than the present practitioners ... shall be permitted to practise at the bar of any of His Majesty's courts in this province, unless such person shall have been previously entered of and admitted into the said society as a student of the laws ... and shall have been duly called and admitted to the practice of the aw as a barrister, according to the constitutions and establishment thereof". Incorporation of the Society occurred in 1822.

On July 17, 1797, at Wilson's Hotel in Newark, Ontario (now Niagara-on-the-Lake), a group of lawyers, including John White, Robert Isaac Dey Gray, and Bartholomew Crannell Beardsley, inaugurated the Law Society pursuant to the 1797 act.

The Law Society's first home was at Wilson's Hotel, then from 1799 to 1832 at various temporary locations at York (Toronto) until Osgoode Hall was built in 1832. The Law Society continued to retain its original name, even though Upper Canada ceased to exist as a political entity in 1841. Throughout the early 1800s, the Law Society imposed increasingly onerous requirements on potential Upper Canadian lawyers, at one point requiring students-at-law to live at Osgoode Hall while they completed their legal studies. Historian Paul Romney argues such licensing requirements enhanced the legal profession's "prestige" in the young colony, as compared to its position in other North American colonies or the United States.

The Law Society was reformed by statute in 1970, under the Law Society Act, 1970. That statute defined the Society as "a corporation without share capital composed of the Treasurer, the benchers, and other members from time to time". Many of the reforms in the 1971 act were inspired by the McRuer report, officially the Report of the Royal Commission Inquiry into Civil Rights (1968), a wide-ranging set of law reform recommendations for Ontario developed under the leadership of James Chalmers McRuer.

On October 27, 1994, the Law Society adopted a "role statement" holding that it "exists to govern the legal profession in the public interest" and has the "purpose of advancing the cause of justice".

The Law Society faced calls to change the name Upper Canada. Benchers voted to drop the name and replace it with a new one. On November 2, 2017, the Society's governing body (Convocation) chose "Law Society of Ontario" as the new name. The name change was made official on May 8, 2018, following amendments to the Law Society Act as part of the 2018 provincial budget implementation bill.

In 2017, the Law Society enacted a requirement that licensees acknowledge an "obligation to promote equality, diversity and inclusion", referred to as a "statement of principles". The requirement was phased in over several months in late 2017. Following a public campaign called "StopSOP", under which a number of benchers were elected who pledged to repeal the requirement, the requirement was repealed in September 2019. Some StopSOP advocates argued that the measure was an example of compelled speech, while opponents argued that acknowledging equal rights was essential.

Oversight 

The Law Society regulates the more than 50,000 lawyers in Ontario. It is responsible for ensuring that lawyers are both ethical and competent. The Society has the power to set standards for admission into the profession. It is empowered to discipline lawyers who violate those standards. Available sanctions range from admonitions to disbarment. It is based in Toronto, at Osgoode Hall.

Beginning in 1970, pursuant to the Law Society Act, 1970, the Law Society has required that potential licensees demonstrate "good character".

Paralegals 
Effective May 1, 2007, as a result of amendments to Ontario's Law Society Act, the Law Society regulates more than 8,000 paralegal licensees in Ontario. Paralegals are licensed to provide limited legal services, such as providing representation before provincial tribunals.

Tribunal decisions 
The Law Society Tribunal is an independent adjudicative tribunal within the Law Society of Ontario that processes, hears and decides regulatory cases about Ontario lawyers and paralegals. It began operations on March 12, 2014.
 
Effective November 16, 2020, Malcolm M. Mercer became the chair of the Law Society Tribunal.

Treasurer 

The Law Society is headed by a treasurer. He or she is elected by the benchers, who comprise "Convocation" – in effect, the Society's board of directors, as the Society is an Ontario Corporation without share capital. All lawyer-benchers are elected by the Society's members, and eight lay benchers are appointed by the provincial government.

The current Treasurer is Jacqueline Horvat (elected on June 15, 2022), and the current CEO of the Law Society is Diana Miles.

Arms

See also 

 CCH Canadian Ltd v Law Society of Upper Canada
 Federation of Law Societies of Canada

References

Sources

External links
 

Ontario
Legal organizations based in Ontario
1797 establishments in Upper Canada

Legal ethics
Organizations established in 1797
Ontario